Agostino Bonisoli (1633–1700) was an Italian painter of the Baroque period, who was born and worked mainly in Cremona. He was the  pupil of the slightly older painter Giovanni Battista Tortiroli, and afterward studied under a relation named Luigi Miradoro Agostino Bonisoli. He was more indebted to his own natural abilities and his studies of the works of Paolo Veronese than either his instructors. He was chiefly employed in easel pictures of portraits, and of religious and historical subjects. His largest work was painted in the Church of San Francesco, Cremona, depicting a dispute between St Anthony and the tyrant Ezzelino

References

1633 births
1700 deaths
17th-century Italian painters
Italian male painters
18th-century Italian painters
Painters from Cremona
Italian Baroque painters
18th-century Italian male artists